Charles or Charlie Parks may refer to:
Charles Parks (sculptor) (1922–2012), American sculptor
Charles Parks (basketball) (born 1946), American basketball player
Charles Darling Parks (1869–1929), American manufacturer
Charlie Parks (baseball) (1917–1987), American Negro league catcher

See also
Charles V. Park (1885–1982), American librarian
Charles Parker (disambiguation)